is a Japanese ice hockey goaltender and member of the Japanese national ice hockey team, currently playing with the Kushiro Bears of the Women's Japan Ice Hockey League (WJIHL) and All-Japan Women's Ice Hockey Championship.

Sato represented Japan at the 2021 IIHF Women's World Championship, where she served as third goaltender behind starter Nana Fujimoto and back-up Akane Konishi. As a junior player with the Japanese national under-18 team, she participated in the 2017 IIHF Women's U18 World Championship and the 2018 IIHF Women's U18 World Championship – Division I, Group A.

References

External links 
 

Living people
2000 births
Japanese women's ice hockey goaltenders